Deconsecration, also referred to as secularization (a term also used for confiscation of church property), is the removal of a religious blessing from something that had been previously consecrated for religious use. In particular, church and synagogue buildings no longer required for religious use are deconsecrated for secular use, or demolishment.

See also
 Desacralization of knowledge
 Desecration

References

Christian worship and liturgy